James Tindal Soutter (1 January 1885, Echt, Aberdeenshire – 8 August 1966, Edinburgh) was a Scottish athlete who competed mainly in the 400 metres.

He competed for Great Britain and Ireland at the 1912 Summer Olympics held in Stockholm, Sweden, in the 4 x 400 metre relay where he won the bronze medal with his teammates George Nicol, Ernest Henley and Cyril Seedhouse.

References

1885 births
1966 deaths
People from Garioch
Scottish Olympic medallists
Scottish male sprinters
Athletes (track and field) at the 1912 Summer Olympics
Olympic bronze medallists for Great Britain
Olympic athletes of Great Britain
Medalists at the 1912 Summer Olympics
Olympic bronze medalists in athletics (track and field)
Sportspeople from Aberdeenshire